Lotus birth (or umbilical cord nonseverance - UCNS) is the practice of leaving the umbilical cord uncut after childbirth so that the baby is left attached to the placenta until the cord naturally separates at the umbilicus. This usually occurs within 3–10 days after birth. The practice is performed mainly for spiritual purposes, including for the perceived spiritual connection between the placenta and the newborn.

As of December 2008, no evidence exists to support any medical benefits for the baby. The Royal College of Obstetricians and Gynaecologists has warned about the risks of infection as the decomposing placenta tissue becomes a nest for infectious bacteria such as Staphylococcus. In one such case a 20-hour old baby whose parents chose UCNS was brought to the hospital in an agonal state, was diagnosed with sepsis and required an antibiotic treatment for 6 weeks.

History

Although recently arisen as an alternative birth phenomenon in the West, super-delayed (1+ hours post-birth) umbilical severance is common in home births.

Early American pioneers, in written diaries and letters, reported practicing nonseverance of the umbilicus as a preventative measure, as they believed it protected the infant from an open wound infection.

Modern practice

In the 1980s, yoga master and midwife Jeannine Parvati Baker was the main advocate for the practice in the United States.

The practice spread to Australia by a midwife, Shivam Rachana, founder of the International College of Spiritual Midwifery and author of the book Lotus Birth.

In the full lotus birth clinical protocol, the umbilical cord, which is attached to the baby's navel and placenta, is not clamped or cut. The baby is immediately placed on the mother's belly/chest (depending on the length of the cord) or kept in close proximity to the mother in cases when medically necessary procedures such as resuscitation may be needed. Lotus birth, after the placenta is born vaginally (often with the maternal informed choice for passive management of third stage allowing for natural detachment of the placenta within appropriate time allowed for it, with no hormonal injections such as oxytocin) or via cesarean section.

Following birth, the placenta is simply put in a bowl or quickly wrapped in absorbent toweling and placed near the mother-baby. Caregivers step back to allow for undisturbed maternal-child bonding to occur as the primary event for an hour or more. It is only after this initial intense bonding period that the placenta is managed by rinsing, drying, applying preservatives, and positioning it in a way that allows for plentiful air circulation and proximity to the baby. The placenta, once ejected from the womb, has no circulation and quickly dies; and within 3–10 days postpartum the umbilical cord dries and detaches from the baby's belly. The practice requires the mother and baby to be home bound as they wait for the placenta and umbilical cord to dry, decompose, and separate from the baby.

Spiritual

Relation to nature

In the animal world, the placenta is usually consumed by the mother. This is called placentophagy. Primates have been observed keeping the placenta attached to their newborns for a longer period. Primatologist Jane Goodall, who was the first person to conduct long-term studies of chimpanzees in the wild, reported that they did not chew or cut their offspring's cords, instead leaving the umbilicus intact, like many other monkeys. Other researchers report that chimpanzees consume placentas after birth. Though other mammals may sever their offspring's cords, they only do so after initial maternal sensory reception, unwinding of the cord, massage/cleaning (through touch), and initiation of nursing. This has been observed to last at least one hour, if left undisturbed.

Energy
Pseudo-scientific proponents of lotus births view the baby and the placenta as one on a cellular level, as they are from the same source, the egg and sperm conceptus. They also assert that the newborn and the placenta exist within the same quantum field, thus influencing various expressions of quantum mechanics that influence health. They claim transfers of energy & cellular information continue to take place, moving gradually from the tissue of the placenta to the baby during the drying process. Scientists challenge this claim of a metaphysical dimension related to quantum mechanics.

Medicine

Lotus births are an extremely rare practice in hospitals.

Risks

The Royal College of Obstetricians and Gynaecologists (RCOG) has stated, "If left for a period of time after the birth, there is a risk of infection in the placenta which can consequently spread to the baby. The placenta is particularly prone to infection as it contains blood. At the post-delivery stage, it has no circulation and is essentially dead tissue," and the RCOG strongly recommends that any baby that undergoes lotus birthing be monitored closely for infection.

Other risks include jaundice caused by abnormally high bilirubin and polycythemia, which is an abnormally high percentage of red blood cells in circulation 

Currently, there are no statistics which show how many woman choose lotus birth. Case descriptions about adverse medical conditions related to this praxis are emerging, indicating severity of potential complications

References

Further reading
Buckley MD., Sarah.  Gentle Birth, Gentle Mothering, Australia, 2006
Davies RN, Leap RN, McDonald. Examination of the Newborn & Neonatal Health:   A Multidimensional Approach, Elsevier Health Sciences, 2008.  
Lim CPM, Robin.  After the Baby's Birth: A Complete Guide for Postpartum Women, Ten Speed Press, U.S. 2001
Parvati Baker, Jeannine.  Prenatal Yoga & Natural Childbirth, North Atlantic Books, U.S., 2001
Rachana, Shivam. Lotus Birth: Leaving the umbilical cord intact, Good Creation Publications, Australia, 2011
Trevathan, Wenda.  Human Birth:  An Evolutionary Perspective, Univ. of New Mexico Press, 2011
World Health Organization (WHO). Care in normal birth: A practical guide, report of a technical working group, Geneva, Switzerland, 1997

Childbirth